Xerapoa is a genus of land planarians from Brazil.

Description 
The genus Xerapoa includes small-sized land planarians with subcylindrical body and anterior end raised. Usually the sensory pits of the anterior region open at the tip of small papillae. The ovaries are located more posteriorly in the body, close to the pharynx, when compared to other genera of the subfamily Geoplaninae, in which the ovaries are closer to the anterior end. The creeping sole is considerably thin, occupying about one third of the ventral side.

Etymology 
The name Xerapoa comes from Tupi xerapoa (sharp-pointed), referring to the spiny aspect of the anterior end in species with sensorial papillae.

Species 
The genus Xerapoa includes four described species:
Xerapoa hystrix Froehlich, 1955
Xerapoa pseudorhynchodemus (Riester, 1938)
Xerapoa trina (Marcus, 1951)
Xerapoa una Froehlich, 1955

References 

Geoplanidae
Rhabditophora genera